Chin Ho Kelly is a fictional character from CBS' Hawaii Five-O. He was portrayed by Kam Fong in the original show from 1968 to 1978, and later by Daniel Dae Kim in the series' remake from 2010 to 2017.

Hawaii Five-O (1968–1978)

In the original show, Chin Ho Kelly was portrayed by Kam Fong from 1968 to 1978. Fong played the role for the first ten seasons, appearing in 237 episodes. The only episodes of the first ten seasons that Fong did not appear in were "Once Upon a Time: Part 2", and "The Ninety-Second War (Part 2)".

The character was killed off in the season ten finale, "A Death in the Family".

Even though the character had been killed off, Fong returned to reprise the role of Chin in the 1997 unaired pilot of Hawaii Five-O.

Hawaii Five-0 (2010–2017)

In the reboot, Chin Ho Kelly was portrayed by Daniel Dae Kim from 2010 to 2017. Kim portrayed Chin in the first seven seasons, appearing in 168 episodes. Kim also portrayed Chin in a crossover episode with NCIS: Los Angeles, and in another crossover episode with MacGyver. Daniel Dae Kim was nominated for the Teen Choice Award for Choice TV Actor: Action, in 2011 and 2012, for his portrayal of Chin.

Lieutenant Chin Ho Kelly is the third member of Five-0. He was a former Honolulu Police Department police officer who left the force due to false allegations of corruption. He is close friends with the McGarrett family as his late father Kam Tong was a long-time colleague of John in the HPD while Chin was trained by John during his rookie days patrolling the beat. In the pilot episode he was recruited by Steve for the new task force and often serves as the team's technical expert and designated sniper alongside his cousin Kono. Throughout the show, he is often seen manipulating the smart board in the office or fiddling with all things digital. He was married to Dr. Malia Waincroft, his long-time on-and-off girlfriend.

Chin attended Kukui High School and was the star quarterback until McGarrett broke his records as a sophomore. After that season, McGarrett was sent off to a military school on the mainland. As a high school student, Chin was described as being multi-talented with a wide variety of interests, having played football and was also in the math club and school band. Little is known about his early career with the Honolulu Police Department except that he had been assigned to District 5 (in real life, covering the areas from Kalihi to Salt Lake) and that Steve's father John was his training officer. He rose to the rank of Detective Lieutenant before leaving over false allegations that he had stolen money from the evidence locker. From his resignation up until Steve's return to Hawaii, Chin was working as a security guard. It is eventually revealed that it was his uncle, a retired cop himself, who had taken money from the HPD asset forfeiture locker, out of desperation over the expenses for his cancer-stricken wife's treatments. Kono confronted Chin about it but he flatly refused to turn his uncle in for fear that it would cause all the cases his uncle had solved to be reopened and the criminals would be released. After it became known that the allegations against Chin were false, he was reinstated to his rank and his badge returned to him.

In the season 2 finale cliffhanger, Chin was put in a difficult position after a group of corrupt ex-HPD cops simultaneously hold Kono hostage and threaten Malia in the couple's own house as part of a plot to free Frank Delano from Halawa. He chose to save his wife but Delano still ordered his men to kill both women. Kono, bound and gagged, was pushed into the sea but was rescued by Adam, who was hiding nearby. The paramedics were unable to save Malia and she died at home.

It is revealed in Season 4 that Chin's father was murdered fifteen years ago by his brother-in-law Gabriel Waincroft, who grew up to become a notorious drug lord despite Chin's efforts to set him straight. At that time, Chin and Malia, then rookies in their respective occupations, were dating and Malia had asked Chin to talk to her wayward younger brother, then a known juvenile delinquent. Kam Tong happened to be at the wrong place at the wrong time when Gabriel was ordered to kill someone as part of his gang initiation. Years later, at Kono and Adam's wedding, Gabriel confronts Chin and tells him that while he was sorry that Kam Tong was the unfortunate victim of his gang initiation, he blamed Chin for failing to protect Malia.

Unlike the other Five-0 members, Chin often rides a motorcycle to work. It has been said that "everyone" knew who Chin was and his intimate knowledge of the island of Oahu and Hawaiian culture, rapport with the locals and ability to speak Hawaiian often aids the team when dealing with locals who are often suspicious of haole cops (such as Danny). His "street smarts" and local knowledge complements Danny's experience as a detective and McGarrett's tactical know-how.

In Season 6 Chin starts a relationship with Detective Abby Dunn and that continued throughout the course of the season in to Season 7. 

Also in season 6, Five-0 investigates a woman's murder where the woman's daughter, Sara, claims to have an uncle in the HPD: Chin. Chin learns that Sara's aunt was his deceased wife Malia, as the girl is Gabriel Waincroft's daughter. Soon after, before he dies, Gabriel apologizes for killing Chin's father and asks Chin to take care of Sara. At the beginning of season 7, Chin tries to get custody of the orphaned Sara, but her aunt and uncle on her mother's side win and take her to Mexico. Following Sara's kidnapping by the Diego drug cartel in a plot of revenge against Five-0, Sara's aunt and uncle relinquish her custody to Chin for her safety

At the end of Season 7, Chin is offered a chance to run the Five-0 Task Force that is being established by the San Francisco Police Department; it is revealed in the Season 8 premiere that he accepted and moved there with Abby and Sara.

Chin's pistol of choice is the SIG-Sauer P229R.  He previously used the HPD standard-issue Smith & Wesson Model 5906.

See also
List of Hawaii Five-0 (2010 TV series) characters

References

Hawaii Five-O characters
Fictional Honolulu Police Department detectives
Fictional police lieutenants
Crossover characters in television